John Cassidy (born 9 June 1947) is a Canadian basketball player. He competed in the men's tournament at the 1976 Summer Olympics.

References

External links
 

1947 births
Living people
Basketball players at the 1976 Summer Olympics
Canadian men's basketball players
1978 FIBA World Championship players
Dalhousie University alumni
Olympic basketball players of Canada
Sportspeople from Calgary
1970 FIBA World Championship players